Keshto Mukherjee (7 August 1925 – 2 March 1982) was an Indian actor and comedian. He was born in Kolkata, Bengal Presidency, British India. He specialised in comic drunkard roles in Hindi films. Though he was famous for his drunkard typecast role in Hindi films, he was a teetotaller throughout his life.
However in his own interview published in the Stardust magazine in 1981, he mentioned the following; "I drink a lot. I started boozing when I left my home town and came to Bombay to become a film hero. I lived in a dingy room in the railway quarters with nothing to eat, but lots to drink. I drank because I was frustrated. I didn’t have any work. I drank to get some sleep, to forget that there were rats running all around the place, that there was a dog sleeping next to me. I drank to relieve the tension. And I only had daaru as my true friend. And again, it was because of this daaru that I gained popularity. Today, if anyone says my name, everyone pictures a bevda. I cannot ditch my friend now. I still drink. The only day when I didn’t touch a drop of liquor was on my wedding day." 

He used to share a very good relation with the iconic director Ritwik Ghatak and had very tiny but important roles in the maestro's films such as the trickster in Bari Theke Paliye, the madman in Ajantrik or character roles in Nagarik and Jukti Takko Aar Gappo.

Death
He died on 2 March 1982 in Bombay, India in an accident.

Selected filmography

Nagarik (1952) - Jatin Babu
Musafir (1957) - Street Dancer
Ajantrik (1958) - Lunatic
Bari Theke Paliye (1958) - Magician
Lukochuri (1958)
Khazanchi (1958)
Parakh (1960) - Compounder Keshto
Masoom (1960) - CID Officer
Aas Ka Panchhi (1961)
China Town (1962) - Keshto
Prem Patra (1962)
Asli Naqli (1962)
Aashiq (1962) - Bheekhu
Aarti (1962) - Johnny
Daal Me Kala (1964) - Mangu
Faraar (1965) - School Janitor
Akashdeep (1965) - Ramu (uncredited)
Teesri Kasam (1966) - Shivratan
Pinjre Ke Panchhi (1966) - Keshto (Barber)
Paari (1966)
Biwi aur Makan (1966)
Mehrban (1967) - Gadhamaharaj's devotee
Majhli Didi (1967) - Bhola - Navin's employee
Baazi (1968) - Madhav
Padosan (1968) - Calcuttiya
Shikar (1968)
Sadhu Aur Shaitaan (1968)
Apna Ghar Apni Kahani (1968)
Anokhi Raat (1968) - Buyer (stammerer)
Chanda Aur Bijli (1969) - Raju
Suhana Safar (1970) - Keshto
Maa Aur Mamta (1970) - Drunkard
Geet (1970) - Keshav
Mere Humsafar (1970) - Abdul Narayan D'Souza
Umang (1970) - Prem Praksh Jagmag (uncredited)
Maa Ka Aanchal (1970) - Drunkard Flower Vendor
Bachpan (1970) - Advocate John - Tom's dad
Guddi (1971) - Kader Bhai
Rakhwala (1971) - Drunk patient (uncredited)
Mere Apne (1971) - Jattu
Memsaab (1971) - Masterji
Lakhon Mein Ek (1971) - Chatterjee
Ek Nari Ek Brahmachari (1971) - Doctor
Door Ka Raahi (1971) - Paunchkaudi
Chori Chori (1972) - Hotel Manager
Piya Ka Ghar (1972) - Baburao Kulkarni
Sanjog (1972) - Mohan's Father
Bombay To Goa (1972) - Sleeping Passenger
Lalkaar (1972) - Keshto
Parichay (1972) - Teacher
Koshish (1972) - The Man irritated by Hari's whistling (uncredited)
Sabse Bada Sukh (1972) - Guide at railway station
Yeh Gulistan Hamara (1972) - Soldier
Bindiya Aur Bandook (1972)
Anokha Milan (1972)
Mem Saheb (1972)
Loafer (1973) - Drunk
Zanjeer (1973) - Gangu
Bada Kabootar (1973) - Abdul
Sweekar (1973) - Drunkman
Samjhauta (1973) - Cheater at R.K.Studio
Chalaak (1973) - Gangaram Sakharam Patil
Achanak (1973) - Man in the train
Nirmaan (1974) - Bajrangi
Apradhi (1974) - Nawab Ashiq Mizaaj
Aarop (1974) - Kunwarelal
Geetaa Mera Naam (1974) - Keshto - Raja's Assistant
Aap Ki Kasam (1974) - Kanhaiya Lal (uncredited)
Jab Andhera Hota Hai (1974) - Drunkard
Chor Chor (1974) - Keshto Mukherjee
Trimurti (1974) - Drunk Man
5 Rifles (1974) - Drunkard
Pran Jaye Par Vachan Na Jaye (1974) - Prospective groom for Janniya
Jeevan Rekha (1974)
Imaan (1974) - Mama
Humrahi (1974)
Call Girl (1974)
Maze Le Lo (1975)
Kaam Shastra (1975)
Chupke Chupke (1975) - James D'Costa (Driver)
Aakraman (1975) - Rangeela
Qaid (1975) - Kanhaiyalal
Pratigya (1975) - Chandi
Kala Sona (1975) - Drunkard
Sholay (1975) - Hariram
Salaakhen (1975) - Qaidi No.840
Mazaaq (1975) - Waiter
Kahte Hain Mujhko Raja (1975)
Do Thug (1975) - Jaggu
Dhoti Lota Aur Chaupaty (1975)
Aag Aur Toofan (1975)
Sankoch (1976) - Dhakkan
Sabse Bada Rupaiya (1976) - Himalaya Club's President
Charas (1976) - Police Inspector Gomes
Zindagi (1976) - Principal 'Kalu'
Sikka (1976)
Rakhi Aur Rifle (1976)
Meera Shyam (1976)
Gumrah (1976) - Kesto - Drunk
Arjun Pandit (1976) - Examiner
Aaj Ka Mahatma (1976) - Pedro
Amaanat (1977) - Drunk
Chala Murari Hero Banane (1977) - Abdul
Tinku (1977) - Truck Driver
Sahib Bahadur (1977) - Trumpet Player
Ram Bharose (1977)
Niaz Aur Namaz (1977)
Naami Chor (1977)
Kitaab (1977) - Pandit Shankar Lal
Kinara (1977)
Inkaar (1977) - Drunk fishing at the china creek
Dildaar (1977) - Raju
Daku Aur Mahatma (1977) - Shersingh
Chacha Bhatija (1977) - Kesto
Agar... If (1977) - Chaman
Aafat (1977) - Pyare Miyan
Rahu Ketu (1978) - Taxi driver
Aakhri Daku (1978)
Naukri (1978) - Hawaldar
Damaad	(1978) - Tulsiram
Azad (1978) - Ramesh Sharma
Giddha (1978) - Policeman
Devta (1978)
Khatta Meetha (1978) - Milkman in the song "Roll Roll"
Dillagi (1978) - Tonga driver
Do Ladke Dono Kadke (1979) - Shantu's husband / Local drunk
Sargam (1979) - Tushar Babu Ghosh / Chatterjee
Prem Bandhan (1979) - Johny - Dr Vinod's Assistant
Jhoota Kahin Ka (1979) - Rahim (Chauffeur)
Gol Maal (1979) - Drunk
Jurmana (1979) - Babu Ram
Duniya Meri Jeb Mein (1979) - Watchman
Hum Tere Ashiq Hain (1979) - Mukherjee
Do Shikari (1979) - Gulu
Salaam Memsaab	(1979) - James
Ghar Ki Laaj (1979) - Manphool
Desh Drohi (1980) - Drunkman in Hotel Room
Khubsurat (1980) - Dayal's cook
Aap Ke Deewane	(1980) - Lawyer
The Burning Train (1980) - Passenger in toilet
Hum Nahin Sudhrenge (1980) - Mukherjee
Red Rose (1980) - Man came to buy brassiere for his girlfriend
Be-Reham (1980) - Ram Prasad
Taxi Chor (1980) - Robert
Qatil Kaun (1980) - Press Manager
Garam Khoon (1980)
Ganga Aur Suraj (1980)
Paanch Qaidi (1981) - Sharaabi
Kudrat	(1981) - Jagat Ram
Mangalsutra (1981) - Drunk in Tonga
Wardat	(1981) - Dharamdas
Naseeb (1981) - Ad Film Director
Rocky (1981) - Drunk Driver
Chhupa Chhuppi (1981)
Shradhanjali (1981) - Rocky - Drummer
Sansani: The Sensation (1981) - Juman Miya
Nai Imarat (1981) - Drinkard
Meena Kumari Ki Amar Kahani (1981)
Main Aur Mera Haathi (1981)
Katilon Ke Kaatil (1981) - Husband of lady with necklace
Jeene ki Arzoo (1981)
Hathkadi	(1982) - Drunkman
Dial 100 (1982) - P. K. Bahke
Meharbaani (1982)
Troyee (1982) - Drunkard
Ghazab	(1982) - Emperor
Dil-E-Nadan (1982)
Waqt-Waqt Ki Baat (1982)
Shiv Charan (1982) - Sweeper
Rachna (1983) - Babu
Paanchwin Manzil (1983)
Divorce (1984) - Shankar dada
Kasam Durga Ki (1984)
Hanste Khelte (1984) - Canteen Owner
Hum Dono (1985) - Shankar
Maa Ki Saugandh (1986)
Aatank (1996) - Phillips Crasto (uncredited) (final film role)

Awards and nominations

References

External links

Indian male film actors
Bengali male actors
1985 deaths
Male actors in Hindi cinema
Indian male comedians
Male actors in Bengali cinema
20th-century Indian male actors
1925 births
Filmfare Awards winners
20th-century comedians